The 1877 Sewanee Tigers baseball team represented the Sewanee Tigers baseball team of the University of the South in the 1877 college baseball season. The team beat Vanderbilt 19–12.

References

Sewanee
Sewanee Tigers baseball seasons
Sewanee baseball